The 2012 Indian Grand Prix (formally known as the 2012 Formula 1 Airtel Indian Grand Prix) was a Formula One motor race held on 28 October 2012 at the Buddh International Circuit in Greater Noida, Uttar Pradesh, India. The race was the seventeenth round of the 2012 championship, and marked the second running of the Indian Grand Prix.

Sebastian Vettel started the race from pole position. Vettel won the race for the second consecutive year, but despite leading every lap of the race, he was denied a Grand Chelem when Jenson Button set the fastest lap of the race. The organisers of the race invited sport shooter Gagan Narang, who won a bronze medal for India at the London Olympics, to wave the chequered flag.

Report

Background
Sergio Pérez was taken ill ahead of the race, forcing Sauber to run test and reserve driver Esteban Gutiérrez in his place for the first free practice session. Pérez was able to return to the car for the second practice session. Valtteri Bottas once again ran in place of Bruno Senna at Williams, while Giedo van der Garde drove Heikki Kovalainen's Caterham.

Ferrari was the centre of controversy over the course of the weekend when they displayed the flag of the Italian Navy on the nose of the F2012 in support of the Italian sailors held by Indian authorities over a shooting incident that resulted in the deaths of two Indian fishermen in February 2012.

Tyre supplier Pirelli brought its silver-banded hard compound tyre as the harder "prime" tyre and the yellow-banded soft compound tyre as the softer "option" tyre.

Following track invasions by stray dogs in 2011, race organisers took precautions by installing ultrasonic devices around the circuit to deter animals from accessing the circuit.

Free practice
The first practice session was run without incident. Sebastian Vettel set the fastest time, despite having spent most of the ninety minutes of the session in his garage. Jenson Button was second, three-tenths of a second behind Vettel, with Fernando Alonso in third, a further tenth of a second behind. Vettel was fastest in the second session as well, setting a time one tenth of a second faster than teammate Mark Webber and six-tenths of a second faster than Fernando Alonso. The under-used surface of the circuit caused problems for several drivers, with Felipe Massa, Romain Grosjean, and Bruno Senna all spinning throughout the session, though all three were able to continue running without forcing the suspension of the session. Vettel was once again fastest in the third practice session, two-tenths faster than Button and Webber.

Qualifying
Force India ensured that their cars were first on track for the first part of Saturday's qualifying session. Kimi Räikkönen, Felipe Massa and Bruno Senna set the early pace while the Red Bulls and McLarens stayed in the garage waiting for the track to become more grippy once rubber had been laid down. Ferrari attempted to improve Fernando Alonso's lap time by making Massa run in front of him on the straight so he could use the slipstream to gain extra top speed. Alonso's lap, however, was not faster than Massa's and the drafting idea was not used later in qualifying, presumably because it did not work. Massa was on a quick lap after this, but accelerated too much out of a corner and spun his car around; he recovered and returned to the pits. Once the Red Bulls and McLarens had set their lap times, the Toro Rosso of Jean-Éric Vergne was left in eighteenth and therefore not within the top seventeen slots times required to make the next qualifying session. He set a lap time, but it was only good enough to move up one place. His teammate, Daniel Ricciardo, was the driver who progressed to Q2 himself when he pushed Vergne back into the eighteenth qualifying slot. Once again, the Caterhams, Marrusias and HRTs occupied the three final rows of the grid. Vitaly Petrov, whose car had needed some last-minute repair just before the session had begun, qualified in nineteenth place and his teammate Heikki Kovalainen ended up twentieth after spinning the car round on his final lap and running back across the track before getting stuck in the gravel. Narain Karthikeyan qualified in twenty-third place for his home Grand Prix, just one-thousandth of a second slower than Pedro de la Rosa. The Marussia cars of Timo Glock and Charles Pic ended up twenty-first and twenty-fourth, and last, respectively. Every car excluding the Red Bulls, McLarens, Ferraris and Lotuses used the softer compound 'option' tyre in the session. Williams driver Pastor Maldonado set the session's fastest time.

The second part of qualifying began under yellow flag conditions because Kovalainen's stricken Caterham was still being returned to the pits. Every driver set a time not long after the flag had been lifted, and many returned to the pits not long after this. There was a flurry of lap times being set at the end of the session, and it was not certain which drivers had made it through until after the chequered flag was waved as every driver but Vettel, Webber and Hamilton came back on track. Kamui Kobayashi qualified his Sauber in a disappointing seventeenth place, while his teammate made it into the final session of qualifying. It was the same story for Romain Grosjean, Bruno Senna and Michael Schumacher who all failed to make Q3 after their teammates did. They lined up on the grid in 11th, 13th and 14th respectively. The Force India team was disappointed at their home race, with Nico Hülkenberg and Paul di Resta only taking the twelfth and sixteenth spots on the grid respectively. At least one of their two drivers had qualified within the top ten at each of the last ten races. Daniel Ricciardo out-qualified Vergne for the thirteenth time in 2012, putting his Toro Rosso in fifteenth position on the grid. Jenson Button completed the final lap of the session to give himself the second fastest time behind Vettel.

Seven teams were represented in Q3, but the Mercedes of Nico Rosberg elected not to run and consequently took tenth place on the grid. Sergio Pérez and Pastor Maldonado did well to qualify their cars in eighth and ninth positions; the Lotus of Räikkönen was in front of them in seventh. The session was split into two informal phases, with cars choosing to make two attempts at a good time. Sebastian Vettel made a mistake on his first flying lap and ran across turn 7, but he set a lap worthy of pole position on his following attempt. Mark Webber set a lap half a tenth slower, initially in front of Button, Alonso and Hamilton. Both Red Bulls abandoned their laps at the very end of the session, as Vettel set a too-slow first sector, and Webber ran wide at turn 3 whilst running behind the McLarens. Vettel took pole position for Red Bull's third consecutive front-row lock-out. Lewis Hamilton set the last lap of qualifying to move his car up to third on the grid, only two-tenths behind Webber. Button qualified fourth in front of Vettel's main title rival Alonso and Massa qualified sixth. This meant that the cars lined up two by two, with Red Bulls taking the front row, McLaren taking the second and Ferrari taking the third. It was only the third time in the  season that no penalties needed to be applied before the start of the race.

Race

Sebastian Vettel took a dominant win, which was his 4th consecutive one ahead of Ferrari's Fernando Alonso who got past Mark Webber when the latter suffered from a KERS problem in his Red Bull. Lewis Hamilton closed up to Webber but couldn't get past and had to settle for 4th place. After this race Vettel extended his Championship lead to 13 points over Alonso.

Post race controversies
There was speculation in the media that the chaotic Indian customs regulations might have cost Fernando Alonso the race. This was because Ferrari could not get certain crucial auto parts and equipment flown into India because of the complex paperwork associated with Indian customs.

A significant drop in race day attendance was noticed, as the number of fans attending the race dropped to 65,000 (from 95,000 in the previous year). Formula One president Bernie Ecclestone stated that he was not worried and that attendance is always high in the first year and tends to go down in the second.

There was also some discontent between Ferrari technical director Pat Fry and Alonso, when Fry stated on Twitter that "In order to be where we wanted and where we were capable of being, we needed to be perfect today and we weren't", after Alonso qualified fifth behind the Red Bulls and the McLarens. Alonso apparently took this as a jibe against his driving skills, and the Ferrari management had to prevent him from responding to it publicly.

Classification

Qualifying

Race

Championship standings after the race

Drivers' Championship standings

Constructors' Championship standings

 Note: Only the top five positions are included for both sets of standings.
 Competitors marked in bold and with an asterisk still had a theoretical chance of becoming World Champion.

References

2012 Formula One races
Grand Prix
2012
Indian Grand Prix